Anis Siddiqi (born 11 April 1959) is a Pakistani former first-class cricketer who played for Lahore cricket team. He later became an umpire and stood in a match in the 2008–09 RBS Twenty-20 Cup.

References

External links
 

1959 births
Living people
Pakistani cricketers
Pakistani cricket umpires
Lahore cricketers
Cricketers from Lahore